William Henderson (1898–1964) was a Scottish footballer who played as a forward. Born in Edinburgh, he played for Airdrieonians before joining Manchester United in 1921. In 36 matches for Manchester United, he scored 17 goals.

In 1925, he was transferred to Preston North End, before spending time on the books of Clapton Orient, Heart of Midlothian, Morton, Torquay United and Exeter City.

References

1898 births
1964 deaths
Footballers from Edinburgh
Scottish footballers
Association football forwards
Airdrieonians F.C. (1878) players
St Bernard's F.C. players
Manchester United F.C. players
Preston North End F.C. players
Leyton Orient F.C. players
Heart of Midlothian F.C. players
Greenock Morton F.C. players
Torquay United F.C. players
Exeter City F.C. players
Scottish Football League players
English Football League players